FCM Flyeralarm Traiskirchen are an Austrian football club, formed in 2022 after a merger between SK Schwadorf and FC Admira Wacker Mödling Amateure, the reserve team of FC Admira Wacker Mödling, and FCM Traiskirchen. They continue as the reserve team of FC Admira Wacker Mödling, who currently compete in the second-tier 2. Liga.

References

FC Admira Wacker Mödling
Association football clubs established in 2008
Football clubs in Austria
2008 establishments in Austria